Fall away may refer to

 Backsliding, in Christianity 
 Fall-away (basketball), a type of basketball shot
 Fallaway (dance), a dance movement
 "Fall Away", a 2009 song by American musical duo Twenty One Pilots
 "Fall Away", a 2005 song by the Fray on their album, How to Save a Life

See also
 Fallaway slam in professional wrestling